Angels in the Snow is a 1969 thriller novel by the British writer Derek Lambert. It is set amongst the western community in the Soviet capital Moscow, mainly journalists and diplomats. Lambert was working as the Daily Express correspondent in Moscow at the time and had to smuggle the manuscript back to Britain. It was a critical and commercial success.

References

Bibliography
Burton, Alan. Historical Dictionary of British Spy Fiction. Rowman & Littlefield, 2016.

1969 British novels
Novels by Derek Lambert
British thriller novels
Novels set in Moscow
Michael Joseph books